Václav Drábek (born October 31, 1976) is a Czech former professional ice hockey defenceman.

Drábek played 35 games in the Czech Extraliga for HC Želeárny Třinec and BK Mladá Boleslav. He also played in the United Kingdom's National Ice Hockey League for the London Raiders, Wightlink Raiders and Streatham IHC.

References

External links

1976 births
Living people
HC Benátky nad Jizerou players
HC Berounští Medvědi players
Czech ice hockey defencemen
HC Havířov players
KLH Vajgar Jindřichův Hradec players
HC Kobra Praha players
BK Mladá Boleslav players
HC Most players
HC Oceláři Třinec players
Sportspeople from Třinec
HC Slovan Ústečtí Lvi players
HC Stadion Litoměřice players
HC Vrchlabí players
Wightlink Raiders players
Czech expatriate sportspeople in England
Czech expatriate ice hockey people
Expatriate ice hockey players in England